American Bicentennial Series may refer to:

Bicentennial Series, a series of American stamps commemorating the Bicentennial in 1976
The Kent Family Chronicles (The American Bicentennial Series), a series of eight novels by John Jakes
Bicentennial Minutes, a series of short educational American television segments commemorating the bicentennial of the American Revolution 
United States Bicentennial coinage of 1975-1976